Thomas F. Coleman is a Canadian mathematician and computer scientist who is a Professor in the Department of Combinatorics and Optimization at the University of Waterloo, where he holds the Ophelia Lazaridis University Research Chair. In addition, Coleman is the director of WatRISQ, an institute composed of quantitative and computational finance researchers spanning several Faculties at the University of Waterloo.

Education 
Coleman earned his PhD from University of Waterloo in 1979 and followed that up with a two-year postdoctoral appointment in the Applied Mathematics Division at Argonne National Laboratory.

Career
From 1981 to 2005, Coleman was a professor of computer science at Cornell University. From 1998 to 2005 he served as the director of Cornell Theory Center, now Cornell University Center for Advanced Computing

From 2005 to 2010, Coleman served as the dean of the Faculty of Mathematics at the University of Waterloo. During his tenure as Cornell Theory Center director, Coleman founded and directed a computational finance academic-industry-government venture located at 55 Broad Street in
New York, which shaped into Cornell Financial Engineering Manhattan.

Research 
Coleman's research is concerned with the design and understanding of practical and efficient numerical algorithms for continuous optimization problems. His work has been applied in many scientific & industrial areas that include finance and risk-management, structural design, logistics and planning, protein structure, data-mining,  medical imaging and informatics.

Awards and honors 
Coleman was selected a SIAM Fellow in 2016 for his contributions to financial optimization, sparse numerical optimization and leadership in mathematical education and industry engagement.

Coleman has published over 80 journal articles in the areas of parallel computing, optimization, automatic differentiation, computational finance, and optimization applications and is the author of three books on computational mathematics.

References

External links 

Living people
Canadian mathematicians
Cornell University faculty
Year of birth missing (living people)